Anthony Vreem (1660, Dordrecht – 1681, Dordrecht), was a 17th-century Dutch painter.

Biography
According to Houbraken he was a promising young painter who learned from Godfried Schalcken in the period that Schalcken was studying at the Latin school where Vreem's father was rector. He died young, still a student, and was mourned in the traditional way of young men in Dordrecht at the time, with laurels on his coffin and laurels worn by the coffin bearers. A sad poem was written in his death notice that Houbraken republished.

According to the RKD he was a pupil of Godfried Schalcken and the only paintings known by him are copies after older masters.

References

Anthony Vreem on Artnet

1660 births
1681 deaths
Dutch Golden Age painters
Dutch male painters
Artists from Dordrecht